Henry Christian Timm (July 11, 1811 – September 5, 1895) was a German-born American pianist, conductor, and composer.

Biography
Timm was born in Hamburg. He worked in New York City as a concert pianist, teacher, organist, and chamber musician. He also helped conduct the New York Philharmonic and served as the president of the city's Philharmonic Society from 1847 to 1864. He composed a Great Mass and many part songs, besides transcribing the works of other composers into versions for two pianos. He died in New York.

References

1811 births
1892 deaths
19th-century classical composers
American classical pianists
Male classical pianists
American male pianists
American classical organists
American male organists
American male classical composers
American Romantic composers
American conductors (music)
American male conductors (music)
German emigrants to the United States
Music directors of the New York Philharmonic
19th-century conductors (music)
19th-century classical pianists
19th-century American pianists
19th-century American composers
Male classical organists